Yankee Speed is a 1924 American silent Western film directed by Robert N. Bradbury and starring Kenneth MacDonald.

A print is preserved at the Library of Congress.

Cast
 Kenneth MacDonald as Dick Vegas
 Jay Hunt as Don Verdugo
 Richard Lewis as Pedro Ramirez
 Milton J. Fahrney as Jose T. Vegas (* as Milton Fahrney)
 John Henry as Ramon Garcia
 Viola Yorga as Marquita Fernandez
 Virginia Ainsworth as Inez La Velle

References

External links
 
 AllMovie/synopsis

1924 films
Films directed by Robert N. Bradbury
1924 Western (genre) films
American black-and-white films
Surviving American silent films
Silent American Western (genre) films
1920s American films